James Thornton Gordon (1886 – 8 December 1959) was an English professional footballer who played as a centre-half.

References

1886 births
1959 deaths
Footballers from Barking, London
English footballers
Association football defenders
Barking Victoria F.C. players
Barking F.C. players
West Ham United F.C. players
Grimsby Town F.C. players
English Football League players